The Edmonton Scottish Soccer Club, better known as Edmonton Scottish, is a Canadian semi-professional soccer club based in Edmonton, Alberta.

Competing continuously in the Alberta Major Soccer League (AMSL) since 1992, the club also fields reserve squads and adult teams across several leagues within the Edmonton and District Soccer Association (EDSA). The first team trains at the Edmonton Soccer Dome and plays its home matches at Hamish Black Field, both of which are located at Grant MacEwan Park in the Ellerslie area of southeast Edmonton.

In 2016, Edmonton Scottish completed the amateur domestic treble, capping off an undefeated season by winning the Challenge Trophy to become Canada Soccer national champions for the first time — having previously finished as runners-up in 1992, 2012, and 2015. They are six-time AMSL league winners and twelve-time provincial champions, capturing the Bennett Shield in 1913 and the Alberta Soccer Challenge Cup a total of eleven times since 1972. The club was recognized by the Canada Soccer Hall of Fame in 2019 as an Organisation of Distinction, and in 2021 it was announced that they have formed a semi-professional team and would begin seeking entry to an interprovincial league.

The club is affiliated with nine-time Jubilee Trophy champions, Edmonton Angels.

History 
The club was founded in 1909 by Scottish immigrants who settled in the Edmonton area. The senior men participate in the Alberta Major Soccer League (AMSL), where they have won multiple league titles.

In 1972, they participated in the Challenge Trophy, the Canadian national amateur championship, reaching the quarter-finals. In 1987, they won the bronze medal in the Challenge Trophy, followed by silver medal performances in 1992, 2012, and 2015. In 2016, following an undefeated outdoor season in the AMSL, they were able to capture their first title as Canadian amateur champions.

The Angels Scottish women's team has won nine Jubilee Trophies as women's national amateur champions, including the inaugural title in 1982, which was the first of five consecutive national titles.

In 2021, the club announced their intention to launch semi-professional men's and women's teams with the goal of participated in a new interprovincial league in 2022.

Facilities

Grant MacEwan Park 
As part of a 1967 Centennial project, the Edmonton Scottish Society acquired a 20-acre parcel of ancestral land in the Ellerslie neighbourhood of Edmonton — an area that had been previously settled by Scots, dating back to as early as 1895. Constructing six soccer fields and a fully fixtured soccer pavilion for its senior teams on the land, the society would officially open the park in 1970 and name it after Lieutenant Governor Grant MacEwan.

In 2018, the grounds were named in the United 2026 FIFA World Cup bid as a potential team base camp. In 2019, plans to build a new,  banquet hall and clubhouse (including twelve changing rooms, a bar, and a restaurant) were announced, with further plans to build a microstadium revealed in 2021.

Hamish Black Field 
For ticketed matches such as the 2021 Summer Series, the club sets up beer gardens and brings in temporary seating, increasing the capacity to 1,612 spectators.

Edmonton Soccer Dome 

In October 2018, construction was completed on the Edmonton Soccer Dome, a  air-supported structure that features a FieldTurf CORE artificial turf playing surface. Located in Grant MacEwan Park, the dome is the club's primary training facility and is occasionally used for matches that may have otherwise been impacted by inclement weather.

Club culture

Rivalries 

Since 1907, the Callies, and later Edmonton Scottish, have maintained three distinct rivalries. Most prominently, the club has had a century-long rivalry with their Scottish Battle of Alberta counterparts, the Calgary Callies, and throughout the 1950s, developed a cross-city rivalry with 1st DFC Victoria following consecutive meetings in Dragoon Cup Finals. A third rivalry with Edmonton Ital-Canadians emerged in the 1970s, with the teams often competing for league titles in EDSA, and later the first iteration of AMSL.

Supporters 
Supporters of Edmonton Scottish are known collectively as the tartan army. For ticketed matches, they are joined by the Clan MacNaughton pipe band, who provide a guard of honour as teams walk onto the pitch.

Team colours and crest 
Edmonton Scottish SC's crest is inspired by the crest worn by Scotland's national soccer team. A roundel encloses a shield, with the words "Edmonton Scottish Soccer Club" written around the outside. In the shield's background lays a lion rampant surrounded by 11 thistle, representing the national flower of Scotland and the number of players on a soccer pitch. The club's official colours are Big Stone Blue and Polo Blue, which symbolize loyalty, strength, trust, and their connection to Scotland, as well as Maroon Flush, which pays homage to the autumn colours of the nearby Ewing Trail tree tunnel.

Kits and sponsorship 
Beginning in 2009, Edmonton Scottish have signed deals with specific kit manufacturers, with Macron currently supplying the club until at least 2024. The club wore Scotland replica kits throughout the '80s and '90s, but have since moved back to their traditional dark blue shirts with white shorts and white socks as its home kit — reversing the colours for its change strip.

Having previously partnered with local businesses, the club has gone without shirt or sleeve sponsors since moving to Macron in 2019.

The club has permanently retired number 20 in honour of midfielder Chris Kooy, who died from colon cancer in 2020.

Players and staff

Roster

Current squad

Current staff 
  Kevin Poissant – Head Coach
  James Black – Assistant Coach

Notable players 
This is a list of players who have played for a national team or have played professionally, either before or after joining Edmonton Scottish.

Player development

Scottish United 
Founded in 2004, Scottish United serves as the youth extension of Edmonton Scottish. Among the inaugural recipients of the Canada Soccer National Youth Club Licence, its youth teams compete in the Alberta Youth Soccer League (AYSL) and within the Edmonton Minor Soccer Association (EMSA). As of 2022, its youth teams encompass over 1,300 players — with over 40% of the female teams in the Greater Edmonton Area playing for the club.

Players training in the youth stream receive MLS homegrown player benefits and are generally eligible to play for the first team or reserve squads as youth trialists by age 16. In recent years, Scottish United players have gone on trial with FC Edmonton, joined Whitecaps FC Academy, or have graduated from youth soccer to the senior club's AMSL or EDSA teams.

Broadcasting 
In order to provide programming to its members during the COVID-19 pandemic, Edmonton Scottish began its own free, in-house streaming service called Fitba.TV along with its youth affiliate, Scottish United in 2020. While the club has since began using its Fitba.TV service to broadcast its 2021 Summer Series home matches, its AMSL matches are live-streamed by CFN Media.

Honours

Record

Alberta Major Soccer League

Challenge Trophy

References

External links 

1907 establishments in Alberta
Association football clubs established in 1907
Diaspora sports clubs in Canada
Scottish-Canadian culture
Soccer clubs in Alberta
Soccer clubs in Edmonton